Knobly Mountain is a ridge and part of the Ridge-and-Valley Appalachians, located east of New Creek Mountain in Mineral and Grant counties, West Virginia, in the United States.

The summit was so named on account of its uneven outline.

References

Ridges of West Virginia
Landforms of Grant County, West Virginia
Landforms of Mineral County, West Virginia